Château de Montréal (Peyrehorade), also known as château d'Orthe, is a château in the commune of Peyrehorade, Landes, Nouvelle-Aquitaine, France. It dates to the 16th century and is a national historical monument (Monument historique).

Notes

Houses completed in the 16th century
Châteaux in Landes (department)
Monuments historiques of Nouvelle-Aquitaine